Oil terminals are a key component of the energy supply industry in Ireland which is extensively based on the import, production and distribution of refined petroleum products. Some crude oil is imported for processing at Ireland's only oil refinery.

Background 
Oil terminals are key facilities for the import, export, storage, blending, transfer and distribution of oil and petroleum products. Terminals are located at coastal sites to facilitate the offloading and loading of coastal shipping. Most terminals have road tanker loading equipment for local distribution of products to industrial, commercial and domestic users. The products handled include petrol, diesel, jet kerosene, fuel oil and heating oil.

List of oil terminals in Ireland 
The table summarises details of the location and operation of the oil terminals in Ireland.

Strategic oil reserves 
Under the National Oil Reserves Agency Act 2007 the National Oil Reserves Agency (NORA) is responsible for ensuring that Ireland retains a minimum of 90 days stock of oil and petroleum products in the event that supplies are disrupted. The Department of the Environment, Climate and Communications (DECC) specifies annually the volumes of oil stocks to be held by NORA. The current minimum (2021) level of stock is:

 1,416,340 tonnes of refined product, (Petrol, Diesel, Gas Oil, Kerosene, and Jet Fuel)
 70,000 tonnes of Crude Oil. 

The National Oil Reserves Agency holds about 72% of its oil stocks in Ireland, and the balance abroad. In Ireland stocks are held in some of the above oil storage facilities including Dublin, Cork (Whitegate Refinery), Whiddy Island (Bantry Bay), Foynes, Shannon, Tarbert (power station), and Galway. Stocks are also held at Derry and Kilroot in Northern Ireland.

Oil imports 
The total import of oil and oil products into Ireland over the period 1990 to 2019 is shown by the graph. The quantity is in thousand tonnes of oil equivalent.

See also 

 Shannon Foynes Port 
 Oil terminals
 Oil terminals in the United Kingdom (for oil terminals in Northern Ireland)
 List of power stations in the Republic of Ireland

References 

 
Fossil fuels
Petroleum in Ireland
Energy infrastructure in the Republic of Ireland
Energy infrastructure in Ireland
Fossil fuels in the Republic of Ireland
Oil terminals